The 'Massachusetts Transgender Political Coalition (MTPC) is an organization dedicated to ending discrimination on the basis of gender identity and gender expression. The MTPC educates the public, lobbies state and local government, and encourages political activism.

The MTPC professes to work guided by the following values: "Equal rights and institutional responsibility; working against all forms of oppression; building broad-based participation and community power; developing leaders and building coalitions; drawing strength from diverse experiences and identities; being informed by our history and elders; growing through challenge and critique; being inclusive of those who cannot be fully visible, and accountability to the communities for which we work."

MTPC was started by transgender activists and allies in September 2001. In early 2002, MTPC members began advocating for non-discrimination ordinances on the basis of gender identity and gender expression in Boston. The ordinance passed in October 2002 with a 9-1 vote. In 2003, MTPC members began advocating for a similar ordinance in Northampton, Massachusetts, which passed in December 2005.

In the summer of 2006, MTPC began developing a campaign for a statewide gender identity/gender expression non-discrimination bill. The legislation to outlaw discrimination in Massachusetts on the basis of "gender identity or expression" was introduced on Jan 10, 2007, by lead sponsors Representative Carl Sciortino and Representative Byron Rushing as House Bill No. 1722, "An Act Relative to Gender-Based Discrimination and Hate Crimes". The bill was passed in 2011. 

The final draft of "An Act Relative to Gender-Based Discrimination and Hate Crimes" didn't include any public accommodations (places that aren't home, school or work). In 2012 their next legislative fight began and it was to ensure those spaces were included in anti-discrimination laws. An act including anti-discrimination regulations was passed in 2016. That act was then contested by anti-trans lobbyists. It was then put on the ballot for the 2018 election. In the election, Massachusetts voters decided to keep these transgender protections on the books.

In 2015 they launched the Identity Documentation Assistance Network. The network was designed to help Massachusetts residents change their legal name and gender markers. 

MTPC hosts a local transgender resource wiki and helpful materials for transgender activism on its website.

MTPC currently has a Boston chapter and a North Shore chapter (NSTA). Mason Dunn is the executive director of the organization, and Maxwell Ng chairs an eight-person steering committee. Current MTPC committees include a policy committee, a community engagement committee, a training, and education committee, a fundraising, and events committee, and the Interfaith Committee for Trans Equality.

See also

 LGBT rights in Massachusetts
 Same-sex marriage in Massachusetts
 List of LGBT rights organizations

References

 Trans bill briefing draws a crowd by Ethan Jacobs, 1/17/2008
 Northampton Human Rights Commission "Gender Identity or Expression - Definition"
 Text of Boston's Ordinance Regarding Discrimination Based on Gender Identity or Expression
 City Council approves transgender ordinance - by Beth Berlo, 10/31/2002

External links
The Massachusetts Transgender Political Coalition website

Transgender Political Coalition
Transgender organizations in the United States
2001 establishments in Massachusetts
Organizations established in 2001
LGBT political advocacy groups in Massachusetts
Organizations based in Boston
Non-profit organizations based in Boston
Equality Federation